Myron Bereza (August 24, 1936  November 24, 2012) was a Canadian international soccer player who earned two caps for the national team in 1957.

Bereza played club soccer for the Toronto Ukrainians and the Rochester Ukrainians.

Bereza was a Ukrainian immigrant to Canada.

References

External links
 

1936 births
2012 deaths
Canadian soccer players
Canadian expatriate soccer players
Canada men's international soccer players
Ukrainian emigrants to Canada
Canadian National Soccer League players
Expatriate soccer players in the United States
Canadian expatriate sportspeople in the United States
Association football forwards
Toronto Ukrainians players
Rochester Ukrainians players